Mesovelia polhemusi is a species of water treader in the family Mesoveliidae. It was originally described from Belize and has since been found in southern Florida.

Mesovelia polhemusi is a marine insect, occupying tidal mangrove forests where few other aquatic insects are found. The species was named for John T. Polhemus.

References

Mesoveliidae
Hemiptera of North America
Insects described in 1990